Kevin K. Sullivan (born 1964) is an American diplomat and the United States Ambassador to Nicaragua.

Education
Sullivan received a Bachelor of Arts degree from Georgetown University and a Master of Arts from Princeton University.

Career
Sullivan is a career member of the Senior Foreign Service. He has been working for the State Department for over thirty years. He has served at multiple capacities including being the Deputy Chief of Mission at the U.S. Embassy in Malawi, Deputy Chief of Mission and Chargé d’Affaires at the U.S. Embassy in Argentina, Interim Permanent Representative for the US Mission to the Organization of American States and has worked in U.S. embassies in Chile, Gambia and Ethiopia.

United States Ambassador to Nicaragua
On July 11, 2018, President Donald Trump nominated Sullivan to be the next United States Ambassador to Nicaragua. On October 11, 2018, the Senate confirmed his nomination by voice vote. He presented his credentials to the President of Nicaragua on November 14, 2018.

Personal life
Sullivan is married to Mariangeles Quinto and has a daughter and a son. He speaks fluent Spanish and basic French.

See also
List of ambassadors of the United States
List of ambassadors appointed by Donald Trump

References 

Living people
1964 births
Ambassadors of the United States to Nicaragua
Georgetown University alumni
University of Pittsburgh alumni
21st-century American diplomats